The Hotel Alexandria is a historic building constructed as a luxury hotel at the beginning of the 20th century in what was then the heart of downtown Los Angeles. As the business center of the city moved gradually westward, the hotel decayed and gradually devolved into a single room occupancy (SRO) hotel housing long-term, low income residents and gained a reputation for crime and being unsafe.

Due to its elegant design and the fact that its public rooms sat disused for decades, it has been the site of countless film shoots, and its iconic Palm Court ballroom is a protected Los Angeles landmark. As the area was revitalized in the first decade of the 21st century, the building found itself at the heart of this and has recently been remodeled as apartments. The building continues to advertise itself for movie locations and social events.

History

Early years
The Hotel Alexandria, designed by architect John B. Parkinson of the firm of Parkinson & Bergstrom and constructed by developers Albert Bilicke (1861–1915) and Robert Arnold Rowan (1875–1918), opened on February 12, 1906 as an 8-story luxury hotel at the southwest corner of Spring and 5th Streets in downtown Los Angeles. 

Its popularity resulted in Parkinson & Bergstrom designing a twelve-story addition, which was built behind the original building in 1911. Bilicke died in 1915 when he went down with the ocean liner RMS Lusitania. Rowan died not long after. Their widows, Gladys Huff Bilicke and Laura Schwarz Rowan, sold the hotel in 1919 to the builders of the nearby Ambassador Hotel, and the Alexandria was for a time part of the Ambassador Hotels System. 

The hotel was the most luxurious in Los Angeles for a number of years until the construction of the Biltmore Hotel three blocks west in 1923. The Ambassador Hotels System sold the hotel in 1927, and it was sold again in 1930, before going bankrupt and closing in 1932. 

The hotel's gold leaf ceilings, furniture, chandeliers and other fittings were sold in 1934 to pay off debts. The hotel was sold again in 1937, to film producer Phil Goldstone, who renovated and reopened it. In 1946, following the end of WWII, Goldstone sold the hotel. In 1954, the new owners altered the original lobby by filling in the mezzanine floor in order to house the Pacific Coast Merchandise Mart. The lobby below was given a "Mid-Century Modern French Provincial look, featuring square pillars, custom-made furniture and planters". It was later acquired by real estate developer S. Jon Kreedman in 1961, who renovated it in 1970 in a faux-Victorian style.

Decay
The Palm Court, by the early 1970s, was in relatively good shape, and was declared as a city historic-cultural landmark on March 3, 1971. By this time, there had been a gradual westward movement of the entire downtown business district. The old heart of Los Angeles along Broadway was abandoned and a new downtown grew up west of the Biltmore along Figueroa. In the early 1980s, the hotel housed "Disco 500" on the first floor. The hotel's decline was becoming noticeable with low occupancy and shabby interiors. It was gradually transformed into a Single Room Occupancy or SRO hotel, housing long-term low-income residents. Its location near Los Angeles's Skid Row meant that it had long since ceased to attract overnight guests. During this period the building became notorious for drug crime and its generally dangerous character.

Rebirth
In 2005, as the area around the hotel was gradually transformed with the conversion of numerous buildings to expensive lofts, the new owners of the hotel converted it permanently into an apartment building. Remodeling was conducted gradually, as short-term tenants moved out. The building today contains a mix of market rate and subsidized housing. The building was declared a historic place. Its elegant ballrooms are frequently rented for events, filming and weddings. From 2010 to 2014, its lobby featured The Gorbals, a restaurant run by Top Chef winner Ilan Hall.

Phantom Wing
The Hotel Alexandria has an additional wing, on the 5th Street side, that is no longer part of the hotel. It was built by local businessman William Chick, who owned the land, in conjunction with the main hotel in 1905. It mirrors the main hotel's design. Each floor offered guest rooms on a hallway that connected to the hallways of the Alexandria. 

When the wing's new owners came into conflict with the owners of the Alexandria in 1938, the Alexandria simply bricked up the hallways on all seven floors at the end of their property, making the hotel rooms in the smaller wing completely inaccessible, as Chick had not constructed stairs or an elevator in his wing, relying on those in the main hotel. The retail spaces on the ground floor remained in use over the ensuing years, while the hotel rooms sat as largely untouched time capsules.

The entire building was finally sold in 2012 for conversion to condos, with no connection anymore to the adjacent Alexandria Hotel.

Film location
The hotel has played host to countless film shoots. Its ornate public rooms, marble staircases and decaying grandeur have made it a favorite of movies, music videos, television commercials and fashion shoots. In David Fincher's Se7en (1995), it served as the residence of the killer, John Doe, for a lengthy chase sequence through much of the hotel. Other films shot in the Alexandria include A Midnight Romance (1919), Dreamgirls (2006), Water for Elephants (2011), Spider-Man 3 (2007), and Domino (2005). The video for Dwight Yoakam's 1987 hit song, "Little Sister", was filmed in one of the ballrooms.

References

External links
The Alexandria Ballrooms website
Hotel Alexandria on the USC LA Walking Tour

Alexandria
Buildings and structures in Downtown Los Angeles
Historic district contributing properties in California
National Register of Historic Places in Los Angeles
Alexandria
Hotel buildings completed in 1906
Hotel buildings completed in 1911
1906 establishments in California
John and Donald Parkinson buildings
Defunct hotels in Los Angeles